Condon may refer to:

Places

Australia
 Condon, Queensland
 Condon, Western Australia, a.k.a. Shellborough

United States

 Condon, Montana
 Condon, Oregon and the nearby
 summit of Condon Butte

Other places
 Condon (crater) on the Moon

Other uses
 Condon (surname), an Irish surname
 Condon Committee

See also 
 Codon  (nucleotides for genetic code)
 Condom (disambiguation)
 Condong (Balinese dance)
 Condong, New South Wales
 Conlon
 Kondon (disambiguation)